Greenbelt is a shopping mall located at Ayala Center, Makati, Metro Manila, Philippines, near Glorietta. It is owned by Ayala Malls, a real-estate subsidiary of Ayala Land, which is an affiliate of Ayala Corporation. It opened in 1988 and is one of the Ayala Corporation's flagship projects. The mall offers a mix of high-end retail shops, restaurants, amenities, leisure and entertainment. Currently, the mall has five sections: two enclosed areas, two buildings with open-air shopping areas, and Greenbelt 5, which was opened in 2007.

History
Built around a  retail complex, the mall merged the previous small arcades and shops. The mall first opened to the public in 1988. Real estate company Ayala Land conceptualized Greenbelt as the Philippines's first lifestyle center with bars, posh boutiques, lush tropical greenery, a world-class museum, and an elegant chapel. It was renovated in 2001, and as the complex grew, Greenbelt 2 and 3 were opened in 2002, with Greenbelt 4 and 5 opening in 2004 and 2007, respectively, based on other pioneer shops in the area.

The mall was undergoing major re-development, with the ground level of Greenbelt 3 closed in 2019 for renovation. The new area reopened in October 2021, which now hosts luxury labels and a newly-renovated Starbucks Reserve cafe. Greenbelt 4 started its renovation works as of the third quarter of 2022.

Facilities

Retail shops

Greenbelt 1 features lifestyle, food, and supply stores, two cinemas, and the OnStage Theater, a performing arts theater home to Repertory Philippines. It is also the location of a branch of The Marketplace, the supermarket chain of Rustan's. It used to be the location of Automatic Centre, the anchor appliance store, until its closure on October 10, 2021.

Greenbelt 2 features high-end restaurants and the Greenbelt Townhomes, a two- to three-story condominium on top.

Greenbelt 3 features a mix of international brands including luxury labels, sit-down restaurants, five cinemas and entertainment facilities. The largest Philippine branch known as Louis Vuitton was found here. It is also the location of the Philippines's third 4DX cinema, launched in 2016.

Greenbelt 4 features high-end boutiques. Also included are branches of H&M and Globe store.

Greenbelt 5 has boutiques of Filipino designers, high-end department store Adora, and boutiques.

Restaurants
Restaurants can be found in Greenbelt 1, 2, 3, and 5, with Greenbelt 1 concentrating more on fast food, and Greenbelt 2, 3, and 5 featuring sit-down restaurants.

Parking
Greenbelt is served by an interconnected basement parking built beneath it. It is also served by parking buildings located at Greenbelt 1 and 2, respectively, and the Paseo Steel Parking, located at the corner of Paseo de Roxas and Esperanza Street. The steel parking and Greenbelt 2 parking are interconnected to each other.

Other
Santo Niño de Paz Greenbelt Chapel is a Roman Catholic place of worship in Greenbelt Park at the complex's center. Built as an open-air, concrete dome in the middle of a pond, the chapel holds masses and other religious services every day for mall patrons and office workers. It celebrates its titular feast day every third Sunday of January.

Incidents
On October 18, 2009 between 11:45 a.m. and 1 p.m., heavily armed thieves overpowered the mall's security guards and broke into a Rolex watch shop in Greenbelt 5. The thieves, dressed in bomb squad uniforms, hammered the glass cases containing Rolex watches. A suspected robber was killed by two police escorts of Taguig mayor Sigfrido Tiñga who, incidentally, happened to be present upon the heist while the other gun-men escaped with an undetermined value of expensive watches.

Fire incidents
April 15, 2010: A fire broke out from an Indian restaurant in Greenbelt 3 at 6:44 p.m., causing adjacent restaurants and the nearby cinemas to temporarily close.
July 4, 2016: A fire broke out from a BPI branch in Greenbelt 1 at 9:11 a.m. It reportedly started from the bank's warehouse. It was put out by 3:31 p.m.

Gallery

See also
List of largest shopping malls
List of largest shopping malls in the Philippines
List of shopping malls in Metro Manila

References

External links

Greenbelt Official website

Shopping malls in Makati
Buildings and structures in Makati
Makati Central Business District
Ayala Malls
Shopping malls established in 1991